The 1994 CAF Cup was the third football club tournament season that took place for the runners-up of each African country's domestic league. It was won by Bendel Insurance in two-legged final victory against Primeiro de Maio.

Preliminary round

|}

First round

|}

Notes
1 Roan United were disqualified because the Football Association of Zambia did not name its entrant in time.
2 Mogas 90 FC, Nakivubo Villa and CAPS United were disqualified because their federations were in debt to CAF.

Second round

|}

Notes
1 Unisport FC disqualified for fielding an ineligible player.

Quarter-finals

|}

Semi-finals

|}

Final

|}

Winners

External links
CAF Cup 1994 - rsssf.com

3
1994